Rodney Jones (born July 28, 1968) is an American professional boxer who competed from 1991 to 2007. He challenged twice for a light-middleweight world title in 2000 and 2007. At the regional level, he held the NABO and NABF light-middleweight titles.

Amateur career
Jones compiled an amateur record of 31-4.

Professional career
Early in his career when Rodney was 28 years old, he beat an eighteen-year-old Antonio Margarito by a ten-round decision. The young fighter went on to become a three-time World Champion.

WBO Light Middleweight Championship
In his first effort at a World Championship he would lose to Harry Simon on September 23, 2000.

IBF Light Middleweight Championship
On February 3, 2007 Jones lost to world champion Cory Spinks in Silver Spurs Arena, Kissimmee, Florida.

References

External links

|-

|-

|-

Boxers from Louisiana
Light-middleweight boxers
1968 births
Living people
Sportspeople from Lafayette, Louisiana
American male boxers